Cristian Pușcaș (born 9 November 1970) is a Romanian former footballer who played as a forward.

Honours
CSM Reșița
Divizia B: 1991–92
Steaua București
Divizia A: 1996–97
Cupa României: 1996–97

Notes

References

1970 births
Living people
Romanian footballers
Association football forwards
Liga I players
Liga II players
CSM Reșița players
FC Dinamo București players
FC UTA Arad players
CSM Jiul Petroșani players
FC Steaua București players
FC Politehnica Iași (1945) players
ASA Târgu Mureș (1962) players
People from Reșița